Podkogelj is a small settlement in the Municipality of Velike Lašče in central Slovenia. It is part of the traditional region of Lower Carniola and is now included in the Central Slovenia Statistical Region.

Name
Podkogel was attested in written sources as Kogol in 1436 and Gugalitsch in 1484, among other names. The name is a fused prepositional phrase that has lost case inflection, from pod 'below' + kogel 'rounded peak'. In this case, it refers to the settlement's location below Kogelj Hill (elevation ), which rises northeast of the village.

References

External links

Podkogelj on Geopedia

Populated places in the Municipality of Velike Lašče